John C. Foster (born April 2, 1935) is an American politician. He served as a Democratic member for the 50th district of the Georgia State Senate.

Life and career 
Foster was born in Habersham County, Georgia. He attended Piedmont University and served in the United States Army.

In 1975, Foster was elected to represent the 50th district of the Georgia State Senate. He was chairperson of the Senate's education committee. He served until 1992.

References 

1935 births
Living people
People from Habersham County, Georgia
Democratic Party Georgia (U.S. state) state senators
20th-century American politicians
Piedmont University alumni